The women's field hockey tournament at the 1999 Pan American Games was the 4th edition of the field hockey event for women at the Pan American Games. It was held over an eleven-day period beginning on 24 July, and culminating with the medal finals on 4 August. All games were played at the Kildonan East Collegiate in Winnipeg, Canada.

Argentina won the gold medal for a record fourth time after defeating the United States 5–2 in the final. Canada won the bronze medal by defeating Trinidad and Tobago 2–0.

The tournament served as the Pan American qualifier for the 2000 Summer Olympics in Sydney, Australia.

Qualification
Alongside the host nation, who received an automatic berth, seven teams participated in the tournament.

Officials
The following umpires were appointed by the PAHF and FIH to officiate the tournament.

Soledad Iparraguirre (ARG)
Janice McClintock (CAN)
Cecilia Valenzuela (CHL)
Joanne Cabrera (CUB)
Gillian Clarke (ENG)
Gina Spitaleri (ITA)
Alicia Takeda (MEX)
Lisa Marcano (TTO)
Judith Brinsfield (USA)

Results

Preliminary round

Pool

Fixtures

Medal round

Bronze-medal match

Gold-medal match

Statistics

Final standings

Goalscorers

References

Women's tournament
Pan American Games
Women's events at the 1999 Pan American Games
Pan American Games
1999
1999 Pan American Games